Terminio is a mountain of Campania, Italy. It has an elevation of 1,806 metres above sea level.

Mountains of Campania
Mountains of the Apennines